Atenulf II may refer to:

 Atenulf II of Benevento (died 940), Prince of Benevento and Capua
 Atenulf II of Gaeta (died 1064), Duke of Gaeta